is a railway station on the Kagoshima Main Line, operated by JR Kyushu in Tosu, Saga Prefecture, Japan.

Lines 
Only local trains on the line stop at the station.

Layout 
The station consists of two opposed side platforms serving two tracks at grade. A siding branches off each of the two tracks near the station. The station building is a small concrete structure which is unstaffed and serves only to house a waiting area, an automatic ticket vending machine, a Sugoca charge machine and a Sugoca card reader. Access to the opposite side platform is by means of a footbridge.

Adjacent stations

History
On 23 December 1928, Japanese Government Railways (JGR) opened the Asahi Signal Box at the present location of the station. On 7 June 1934, the facility was upgraded to a full station and renamed Hizen-Asahi. With the privatization of Japanese National Railways (JNR), the successor of JGR, on 1 April 1987, JR Kyushu took over control of the station.

Passenger statistics
In fiscal 2016, the station was used by an average of 650 passengers daily (boarding passengers only), and it ranked 215th among the busiest stations of JR Kyushu.

References

External links
Hizen-Asahi (JR Kyushu)

Railway stations in Fukuoka Prefecture
Railway stations in Japan opened in 1934